A by-election was held for the British House of Commons constituency of Penistone in South Yorkshire on 11 June 1959.  The seat had become vacant on the death of the Labour Member of Parliament Henry McGhee, who had held the seat since the 1935 general election.

Result
The result was a hold for the Labour Party.

See also
 Penistone constituency
 1921 Penistone by-election
 1978 Penistone by-election
 Town of Penistone
 List of United Kingdom by-elections

References

By-elections to the Parliament of the United Kingdom in South Yorkshire constituencies
1959 in England
1959 elections in the United Kingdom
Politics of Penistone
Elections in Barnsley
1950s in Yorkshire